Jacques Pourtau (born 12 November 1935) is a French wrestler. He competed in the men's Greco-Roman lightweight at the 1960 Summer Olympics.

References

1935 births
Living people
French male sport wrestlers
Olympic wrestlers of France
Wrestlers at the 1960 Summer Olympics
Sportspeople from Landes (department)
20th-century French people